The ARIA Albums Chart ranks the best-performing albums and extended plays (EPs) in Australia. Its data, published by the Australian Recording Industry Association, is based collectively on the weekly  digital sales of albums and EPs.

Chart history

Number-one artists

See also
2013 in music
ARIA Charts
List of number-one singles of 2013 (Australia)

References

Digital 2013
Australia albums
Number-one albums